Megalopyge nuda is a moth of the Megalopygidae family. It was described by Caspar Stoll in 1789. It is found in Guyana, Paraguay, and Brazil.

References

Moths described in 1789
Megalopygidae